Dandak may refer to:
Dandak, a kingdom in Hindu mythology; see Dandaka
Dandak, alternate name of Davudak, a village in Iran
Dandak cave, in Kanger Ghati National Park